Abbot Kinney Boulevard is a mile-long road lined with shops, restaurants, and galleries located in the southern part of Venice, Los Angeles, California.  It stretches from  Washington Boulevard to Main Street and is home to one-of-a–kind local goods as well as internationally recognized brands. Abbot Kinney Boulevard is named after Abbot Kinney, a 19th century millionaire entrepreneur. In 2012, GQ magazine called Abbot Kinney "The Coolest Block in America." The street has numerous international flagship stores, boutiques, art galleries, salons, and fitness studios. Abbot Kinney is also a popular nightlife spot. Until 1991 this street was commonly known as "West Washington Blvd." information which may help someone looking for historical addresses such as the childhood home of Ron & Russell Mael, Bulldog cafe at 1153 or Eames at 901.

Real estate and demographics
The median real estate price in Abbot Kinney is $1,331,394 as of 2016, which is more expensive than 94.7% of the neighborhoods in California and 99.3% of houses in the United States. The average rental price in Abbot Kinney is currently $2,200 based on Neighborhood Scout’s Analysis. Abbot Kinney Blvd/Boccaccio Avenue is an urban neighborhood and is mainly made of small to medium-sized apartment complexes and single family homes. Most of the homes have been built around 1970 and 1999. The current vacancy rent is 2.4%, which is a lower rate of vacancies than 90.6% of all neighborhoods in the U.S. The neighborhoods consist of mainly same sex couples. According to Neighborhood Scouts analysis, this is a larger proportion of same sex households than in 99.5% of the neighborhoods in America. 2.1% of the neighborhood’s residents have Swiss ancestry and 4.2% Russian ancestry. Bicycle commuting is very popular in the Abbot Kinney neighborhood. 3.5% of the residents commute to work on a bicycle and has more commuters than 95.4% of all neighborhoods in the U.S. The Abbot Kinney residents are wealthy and represent 15% of the highest income neighborhoods in America and has a higher income than 85.7% of the neighborhoods in America.

Art on Abbot Kinney
Venice is well-known for its art scene and creative culture. Several outdoor murals are located around Abbot Kinney. One of the most famous artworks is the “Touch of Venice” mural which is located on Windward Avenue by Danny’s Deli.  The 1958 film, “Touch of Evil”, by Orson Welles inspired the adaption of the mural. It is 102 feet by 50 feet and was created by artist Jonas Never. Jonas Never designed the mural similarly to the opening scene of “Touch of Evil” instead of painting it like a photograph.

So Far So Good is a popular painting on an exterior building of a boutique on Abbot Kinney Boulevard. The painting, was commissioned by Marcus Wainwright and David Neville from New York based brand Rag & Bone.  The painting was created by Alex Yanes. The painting consists of vibrant colors, graphics, and various words. Alex Yanes was born in Miami and in 2006 he decided to pursue a career in art. Yanes was influenced by his Cuban and Miami roots during the 1980s and 1990s. Yanes spent several years in skateboard, hip-hop and rock culture. He won his first art contest at the age of six.

Attractions and activities
The Boardwalk, also known as the "Venice Ocean Front Walk", offers locals and tourists a variety of shops, restaurants, street performers, artists, and more. The boardwalk is one of the largest places in Los Angeles and attracts many visitors. Venice Beach is located just minutes away from Abbot Kinney boulevard and offers a variety of activities and has one of the greatest beaches in Los Angeles according to Discover Los Angeles. The Venice Breakwater is a popular and favorite local spot which was built by Abbot Kinney in 1905. Its purpose is to protect the amusement pier. Surfing is a popular famous activity and Go Surf LA provides lessons. Abbot Kinney is a famous shopping destination for travelers and locals, and is located blocks away from Venice Beach. The clothing shops range from surf tees, beach cruisers, furniture shops, and modern designer clothing. Popular for its art, Abbot Kinney Boulevard offers several galleries.

Abbot Kinney First Fridays is a popular attraction and it occurs every first Friday night of each month and the boulevard is transformed to a street festival filled with live music, food trucks, and shopping. The "Abbot Kinney First Fridays" typically occur between Venice Boulevard and Westminster generally between 5 p.m. and 11 p.m. There are over 20 food trucks offering a variety of different cuisines.

The Holiday Stroll takes place every Sunday of December where the merchants of Abbot Kinney begin the Holiday season with a variety of popular activities, real snow, and sledding. For over 30 years, The Abbot Kinney Film Festival takes place among a mile-long stretch on Abbot Kinney Boulevard. The festival offers free admission, 300 vendors, kids rides and games, 5 live music stages, and 3 beer gardens. The festival is the biggest fundraiser of the year which draws over thousands to Venice.

Food and culture  
Abbot Kinney Boulevard is home to a variety of popular restaurants which offer a variety of cultural food. Gjelina is an American restaurant on Abbot Kinney and considered one of the best restaurants in the city by the review Web site The Infatuation".

The Toms Shoes flagship store on Abbot Kinney Boulevard is a popular coffee shop. Its founder, Blake Mycoskie, launched Toms Roasting Co. to provide over 335,000 weeks of safe water to over six countries. Their flagship location on Abbot Kinney is a mixture of a coffee shop and a shoe store. LAist says that the Toms flagship as a lifestyle "embodies the lifestyle of the Venice brand" with wood accents.

Salt & Straw is a Portland-based ice-cream shop that opened on Abbot Kinney and the Venice art district in Fall 2015. The shop is a 1,035-square foot space and is located on the corner of Abbot Kinney and California Avenue. Notably, Salt & Straw offers a variety of ice-cream flavors inspired by Los Angeles. Flavors include Avocado & Strawberry Sherbet, Honey Lavender, Almond Brittle with Salted Ganache, and Silencio Black Tea & Coconut Stracciatella.

Blue Bottle Coffee and Intelligentsia are popular coffee spots, for those of you who are coffee lovers.

Film and entertainment
Abbot Kinney Boulevard is a popular area for film shoots and other entertainment purposes. Commercials, television shows, and movies are filmed on Abbot Kinney Boulevard. Popular works include the television series Flaked and Californication, and films such as Chef, starring actresses Sofía Vergara and Scarlett Johansson.  The Other Venice Film Festival occurs every year where The Abbot Awards are given to filmmakers who create poignant and alternative cinema. The award show also honors the founding father, Abbot Kinney, and it is a weekend long celebration. The festival accepts several types of entertainment works such as full-length movies, short films, music videos, documentaries, and animated works. Most importantly, they all embody the spirit and diversity that Venice is recognized for. The films are made with lower budgets and less technological advancements compared to other companies.

Celebrities
The neighborhood in Venice, California, is home to many Hollywood actors. Robert Downey Jr. kept an apartment on the boardwalk during the 1990s and Jim Morrison lived in Venice for two years. Other well-known residents include Julia Roberts, Kate Beckinsale, Nicolas Cage, Mark Valley, as well as photographer Lauren Greenfield.

References 

Boulevards in the United States
Streets in Los Angeles
Venice, Los Angeles
Shopping districts and streets in Greater Los Angeles